Dauresia is a genus of flowering plants belonging to the family Asteraceae.

Its native range is Namibia.

Species:

Dauresia alliariifolia 
Dauresia flava

References

Senecioneae
Asteraceae genera